The Secret World of Benjamin Bear is a Canadian animated television series and a joint effort produced by Amberwood Entertainment, Secret Bear Productions, and produced with the participation of Bell Broadcast and New Media Fund including animation by Philippine Animation Studio. It originally aired on Family Channel from 2003–2009. 52 episodes were produced.

The Secret World of Benjamin Bear is a continuation series following The Teddy Bears' Picnic (1989), The Teddy Bears' Christmas (1992), and The Teddy Bears' Scare (1998) which were set in the 1970s with the young Simon and Sally Tanner, and follows the new adventures of Benjamin Bear, set 30 years later in the 2000s where he's now owned by Max Tanner, the son of the now older Simon Tanner. Benjamin is accompanied by his teddy housemate and best friend Howie Bear who, following the same theme of the original Teddy Bears series with Wally, is young and inexperienced, and must learn from Ben.

Characters

Teddy Bears
 Benjamin "Ben" Bear (voiced by Jonathan Crombie) - The main protagonist of the series. He is orange colored and wears a red vest. His owner is Max Tanner, and his best friend is Howie. He is shown to be a true gentleman to everyone in the teddy world. Out of all the teddy bears, Benjamin is one of the most trustworthy and often called on to help the others, especially the new teddies. He is allergic to lavender. When he gets mad, he crosses his arms and taps his foot (however, he denies doing this).
 Wally - (Voiced by Stuart Stone) A teddy bear who is an old friend of Ben's. He is owned by Simon's sister Sally. He is a light grey color and wears a blue with white stripes sailor collar drop cardigan. Although he was first seen in The Teddy Bears' Picnic, his origin was explained in The Teddy Bears' Christmas that's set two years prior when Ben travelled to Maclarean's Toy Store to help Santa make Sally's wish for a teddy bear of her very own come true, where he met Wally who is the only teddy of his kind to come to life for that special purpose. Not named, he was named Wally by Sally when she received him on Christmas Day.
 Doc - (Voiced by Tracey Moore) A teddy bear that belonged to Amanda who only appeared in The Teddy Bears' Picnic. Amanda came to the picnic with Ben and Wally to find him. When all the Teddys go teddy, and after Ben and Wally called them to put their fears aside for once to help Amanda find Doc, Doc eventually spoke up and the two were reunited. He is light brown with a yellow-orange shirt, has button eyes and a round little nose.
 Howie Bear - Howie is Ben's best friend. He is yellow colored and wears white t-shirt and green overalls. Even though Howie is young and inexperienced, he is eager to learn. His owner is Eliza Tanner.
 Edgar of Old (voiced by John Stocker) - A 200-year-old pale yellow bear and the first teddy bear ever made, he was the stuffed bear originally given to T.H. Roosevelt, which is stated in the show to be where the term "Teddy Bear" originates. He wears a navy blue vest and white collar. He is the leader of the teddy community. Due to his extensive age he tends to walk slowly and isn't as agile as the others, but otherwise doesn't show his age. His owner is Miss Abby Periwinkle, and she is the only human who knows that the teddy bears are alive.
 Ruby Red - A friend of Ben's whom he has a crush on. She is dusty rose colored and wears a red ribbon around her neck. She is owned by a toy store owner named Maclarean. She is a sweet bear, and gets along well with Ben and Howie. She is always willing to lend a helping hand. In the episode "Proudly Purple", Ruby and Ben tell each other how much they have in common and eventually tell how much they love each other.
 Holly Bear - (voiced by Emma Taylor-Isherwood) A panda teddy bear and a very close friend of Howie. They are always seen playing chess together; however, Holly always wins. Her owner is Lindsay.
 Sebastian Biggleboar - (voiced by Terrence Scammell) A pompous bear who considers himself better than everyone else and speaks with a British accent. He is brown colored and wears a blue bowtie. He enjoys causing trouble for Benjamin and Howie or embarrassing them. Sebastian has a crush on Trixie Belle, and he considers her the perfect girl, and one of the few things other than himself that he loves. His owner is Bobbie.
 Raymond - (voiced by Rick Jones) A purple teddy bear with pink torso who was a carnival prize before being dumped on the street. After wandering around the woods nearby, he was found by Ben and Howie, and taken to MacLaren's toy store, and put on a rocking chair next to the entrance.
 Toot Sweet - (voiced by Terrence Scammell) A polar teddy bear with red and green scarf and hat, who runs Toot's, a diner where bears like to congregate. He is famous for honey shakes. When his kid went to college, he tried to stop him, but stopped when his kid promised he would return.
 The Clean-up Crew - Three small teddy bears who belong to three energetic children. They're brown colored and usually seen in black suits and sunglasses (although, unlike other teddies, they only wear clothes when they're "on duty"), and riding around in a toy gyrocopter with a bucket on a string hanging from it. It's their job to deal with big problems that arise in the teddy world.
 Winifred - A teddy who works in the teddy council and was once in the teddy marching band. She is pink colored and wears glasses and pale blue ribbon around her neck.
 Trixie Belle - A Teddy Tech graduate whom Sebastian has a crush on. She is brown colored and wears an orange ribbon around her neck.
 Mrs. Crackers - A female teddy bear who runs the library. She is beige colored and wears glasses, green shirt and bow on her head.
 Felix - Felix was Laura's old teddy and now he lives in Italy with his new owner, who is a girl named Antonia. He is golden yellow with purple stitch on his tummy.
 General - A military teddy bear with an English accent. He is very strict about order due to his militaristic nature. He is brown colored and wears military helmet and medals on his chest.
 Mr. Lister - The teddy bear in charge of the Teddy Relocation Center. He is grayish-brown colored and wears glasses and orange collar shirt with brown tie. 
 Buzz - Buzz is a teddy that appeared in the episode "Close the Door Ben", when Ben tried to find his child. He is light brown colored and wears a green vest.
 Enrico – Enrico is Ruby Red's friend who lives in Italy.
 Lily - A young teddy bear. She has problems with going teddy (she will do so whenever she's excited). She is part of the general's marching band. She is beige colored and wears yellow dress and bow on her head.
 Dr. Tiffany Tuff - A teddy bear who is a physician. She runs the Teddy Hospital. She is brown colored and wears a lab coat and a pink bow on her head.
 Freddy - A teddy bear that was handmade from gray woolen socks.
 Gonzo Bernie Mrs. Poppy Samantha Louie Albert Tatayoshi Angus Frankie Woowly 
 ‘’’Bertie’’’ 
 ‘’’Happy’’’
 ‘ ‘Ravi’’ 
 ‘ ‘ Beeline’’ 
 ‘’Finningen’’

Humans
 Max Tanner - Simon's son, Eliza's brother and Benjamin's owner. Max was given Benjamin by his father, who was Benjamin's previous kid.
 Eliza Tanner  - (voiced by Emma Taylor-Isherwood) Howie's owner. She is Max's younger sister.
 Simon Tanner - (voiced by Ryan Lindsey (Young Simon)/Terrence Scammell (Adult Simon)) Max's father, and Benjamin's previous owner. He is a very creative man, and enjoys tinkering. Unfortunately, most of his inventions don't work properly. In The Teddy Bear Christmas, he was a brash kid who stopped believing in Santa. He owned two Bulldogs throughout his lifetime, both named Slurp.
 Sally Tanner - (voiced by Elissa Marcus in The Teddy Bears' Picnic and Kylie Schibli in The Teddy Bears' Christmas) Simon's younger sister who in The Teddy Bear's Picnic accidentally spilled tea on Wally while having a tea party. Two years prior in The Teddy Bear's Christmas, she was the only child who still believed in Santa and wished for a teddy bear of her very own. That bear would end up being be Wally.
 Laura Tanner - The kind and caring mother of Max and Eliza and the wife of Simon Tanner who was the owner of Felix.
 Betty - (Voiced by Samantha Rushforth) Only appeared in The Teddy Bears' Christmas, she was Simon and Sally's kind babysitter who had a part time job as being an elf in Santa's Workshop in Maclarean's Toy Store. Ben and Wally snuck into her bag as a way of getting out of the store and jump out as she walks past the Tanner's house.
 Boy on Sled - (Voiced by Johnathan Cameron) Only appeared in The Teddy Bears' Christmas, When Ben clambered over the wall on his journey to Maclarean's Toy Store in order to find a Teddy Bear for Sally, he fell onto a sled pulled by the boy. As he got to the high slope, he noticed Ben and invited him for a ride on the sled, of which Ben flew off and hurtled into many misadventures on his way to Maclarean's Toy Store.
 Bobbie - Sebastian's owner. She considers herself superior to Max and Eliza. Her father dotes on her and she has a Doberman Pinscher named Chomper, who loves Sebastian.
 Amanda - (Voiced by Marsha Moreau is a little girl that only appeared in The Teddy Bears' Picnic. She noticed her teddy bear Doc was missing and got lost in the woods when finding him. Ben went teddy when he and Wally came across her, but Wally helped to comfort her by telling her that Doc is at the Teddy Bears' Picnic, which caused the annoyed Ben to go unteddy. Since she is a people and that her appearance would make the other Teddys go teddy, they tried disguising her as a Teddy Bear. It worked, until Wally accidentally gave her flowers that made her sneeze and all the Teddys went teddy. Ben and Wally then tried to tell the Teddys to go unteddy for just this once to help her find Doc, and when Doc did reveal himself and the two were reunited did all the other Teddys went unteddy. Amanda promised to keep the picnic a secret, and after the picnic, Doc helped guide Amanda home after saying their goodbyes to Ben and Wally.
 Miss Abby Periwinkle - Edgar's owner. She is the only human who knows that teddy bears can walk and talk like humans. When she was a child, she tried to pilot a sailboat by herself but was knocked unconscious by the sail's boom when she steered it. Edgar steered the boat back to the dock in order to save her, but she regained consciousness and saw him. She told her friends her bear was alive but nobody believed her, and they began treating her like she was weird. Edgar saw how much this hurt her and admitted to her that teddies were alive, but it was a secret only she could know. She has kept this secret ever since, and her house is the only one that teddies can come and go as they please without having to hide or go teddy.
 Mr. Maclarean - (voiced by Terrence Scammell) Ruby's owner. A Scottish man who owns a large toy store called "Maclarean's", and behaves like a child himself. He has also taken several trips around the world, and has plenty of stories to tell. He has a sister who wishes he acted his age.
 Lindsay - Holly's owner. She is friends with Eliza.
 Store Clerk - (Voiced by Thelma Farmer) A minor character who only appeared in The Teddy Bears' Christmas, she cheerfully operates the elevator and announces each floor with rhymes. She notices Ben when the elevator stopped on the fifth floor and placed him on a high shelf.
 Mr Jones - (Voiced by Johni Keyworth) An old but friendly Night Watchman who works in Maclarean's Toy Store. He only appeared in The Teddy Bears' Christmas.
 Santa - (Voiced by Jim McNabb) Only appearing in The Teddy Bears' Christmas, Santa happily played his part in the Santa's Workshop in Maclarean's Toy Store. He left the store with Betty after giving the night watchman, Mr Jones his Christmas present, which were his childhood favorite, Captain Ray comics. Santa is the only human to respects the Teddy Bear Rule, for when Santa and Betty parted ways, he secretly wished merry Christmas to Ben and Wally who were hiding in Betty's bag, giving them a shock that he'd known of them the whole time. It was assumed that Santa saved Wally from the snow clearing truck, had him dried, wrapped and delivered under the tree for Sally to find. He wrote in a note "Too Sally, Love Santa & Ben".
 HectorAnimals
 Slurp - Slurp is the Tanner's family Bulldog. He is very playful and friendly, with humans and teddy bears alike. He is called Slurp because of his slobbery dog kisses. Slurp was probably named after the bulldog Simon once had in his childhood, as appeared in The Teddy Bears' Christmas where this Slurp was antagonistic towards Ben whenever he's not teddy, violently shaking and throwing him about to make him unteddy whenever he is. He ate all the Christmas cookies, even chewed up Sally's letter to Santa, and when Ben and Wally returned to the house from Maclarean's Toy Store, Slurp violently shook Wally and threw him over the wall, only to be shovelled away by the snow cleaning crew. 
 Chomper - Chomper is Bobbie's dog. He only likes Sebastian and dislikes Ben and Howie. Sebastian enjoys seeing Chomper chase Ben and Howie around.
 Marigold - Marigold is Lindsay's dog. She is very energetic and loves to disturb the teddies.
 Froth Moth - A Froth Moth is a fictional species of moth that feeds on teddy bear stuffing. As a result, Froth Moths are the most feared creature in the teddy world. They don't like lavender, which teddy bears use to fend them off.
 Champ - Champ is Mike's pet dog. He loves to play teddy fetch with Trixie Belle.
 Patches - Patches is Eliza's cat. She likes to cause trouble with just about everything she can, especially Ben and Howie.

Locations
 Maclarean's Toy Store - This is Mr. Maclearean's toy store. There is a teddy library, a place where the teddy council meets, and other secret teddy hiding places.
 Toot Sweet's Garden Cafe - This is Toot Sweet's café. The owner, Toot, is known for making honey shakes.
 Abby Periwinkle's House - This is the home of Miss Periwinkle. She lives there with her bear Edgar. There are different teddy hiding places in the house. Miss Periwinkle's garden is used for special occasions like Greeting Ceremonies.
 Tanner House - This is where the Tanner family lives. There are different teddy tunnels so Ben and Howie can get from "room to room" and "place to place" easily.
 Bobbie's House - This is where Bobbie's family lives. It is the neighboring home to the Tanner House. Chomper acts as a watch dog to the house at night.
 Teddy Hospital - The Teddy Hospital is in a real hospital. This is where the teddies go if they have teddy health problems, such as new stuffing or stitching.
 The Library'

Episode list

Season 1
 Fuzz and Buzz; Game Over
 Just for Laughs; Auctioning Edgar
 Green-Eyed Monster; Last Minute Leader
 Lights, Camera, Caught!; Over the Volcano
 Happy Campers; Teddy Picnic
 Maxwell's Dilemma; Abominable Bear
 Ooey Gooey; Wrong Howie
 Best Friends; Harry Hamster
  Driving Miss Hilda Crazy; One Stormy Night
  Cracking Up; Trouble for Toots
 A Star is Born; Who Took the Teddifesto?
 Quest for the Holly Bear; Bears Away
 Cargo Cat; Perfect Match

Season 2
 The Big Scare; Raymond's Frisky Friend
 Teddy Tech; Badminton Bet
 Outbreak; Triple Trouble
 General Alarm; Bouncing Bertie
 Clean Up Kid; Lucky Raymond
 Finding Felix; Froth Fright
 Canine Chaos; There and Back
 Edgar's Tale; Deep Secret
 The General's Kid; Just Like Ben
 Teddy Splat Spat; Close the Door, Ben!
 Teddy Trails; Yo Ho Ho
 Ben Between; Teddy Training
 Happy Birthday Mrs. P; Top Teddy

Season 3
 Fixing Freddy; Bad Hair Daze
 Lister Says; Sweet n' Sour
 Fitting In; Itch to Switch
 Edgar's Letter; Room at the Top
 Teddy Tango; Sebastian Calling
 Teddy Kite Flight; Hand-Me-Down Bear
 Saving Sebastian; Tuff Love
 Following Finnegan; Raymond's Place
 Zowie Howie; Grow Seed Grow
 Tunnel Trouble; Teddy Overdrill
 Lister's Mistake; Teddy Return
 Rocket Teddy; Teddy Tracker
 The Raymond Reaction; Big Bear

Season 4
 Teddy Time; Lonesome at the Top
 House Bound Bear; Howie Power
 Teddy Flip Flop; Proudly Purple
 Ben's Decision; The General's Bath
 Teddy Slow Down; Going Home
 Ben's Nose Knows; A Tickle Too Far
 Helping Happy; Fishy Friendship
 Blip Blork; Finders Keepers
 A Teddy's Dream; Ben's Day Off
 Teddy Trick; Sebastian's Chance
 Freddie's First Snow; The Perfect Gift
 Sebastian the King; The Trouble with Toots
 Too Much Champ; Happy's Big Day

See also
 Teddy bear

References

External links
 
 [IMDB entry: https://www.imdb.com/title/tt0898768/]
 Amberwood Entertainment's The Secret World of Benjamin Bear Page
Web Archive of The Secret World of Benjamin Bear 2011https://web.archive.org/web/20110707130159/http://amberwoodent.com/brands/benjaminbear

2000s Canadian animated television series
2003 Canadian television series debuts
2009 Canadian television series endings
Amberwood Entertainment
Canadian children's animated fantasy television series
Animated television series about bears
Family Channel (Canadian TV network) original programming
Television shows set in Ottawa
Sentient toys in fiction